Ardfern (meaning "the head-land of alder-trees") is a village in Argyll and Bute, Scotland. It lies on the south coast of the Craignish peninsula, facing Loch Craignish.

Ardfern lies between the towns of Oban to the north and Lochgilphead to the south. On the east side of the Craignish Peninsula is Nether Lorne, Argyll. The population is approximately 400.

References 

Villages in Argyll and Bute